Sir Charles Wale KCB (16 August 1765 – 20 March 1845) was an English General and the last British governor of Martinique between about 1812 and 1815. On 25 February 1831 he was appointed Colonel of the 33rd Regiment of Foot and was given the governorship in recognition of his role in the capture of Guadeloupe from the French in 1810. He was later knighted for his service.

Early life and family
His father was Thomas Wale and his mother Louisa Rudolphina Prediger Raften (who came from Riga). Charles's older sister Mary married a Thomas Pemberton of Trinity College, Cambridge. Wale attended Wisbech Grammar School and later studied in London.

He began his military career in 1779 with the 88th Foot under Colonel Thomas Keating. He initially served in Jamaica and in 1780 became a lieutenant in the 97th.  With his new regiment he sailed to Gibraltar with Vice-Admiral George Darby's fleet in 1781 and participated in the latter part of the defence of Gibraltar during the Great Siege of Gibraltar. He later went on to serve in Ireland, the Channel Islands and the Cambridgeshire Militia.  In 1799 he participated in the Anglo-Russian invasion of Holland.  He also served again in Jamaica and in Bengal.

Marriage and children 
Charles married Louisa Sherard in 1793.  She died in 1896.  They had six children.  Charles married a total of three times.  He had twelve children including author the Reverend Henry John Wale M.A. and Frederick Wale (1822–1858) who was present at the relief of Lucknow and command of the 1st Sikh irregular cavalry ('Wale's horse').

Monuments
The following summary of the life of Charles Wale comes from the Charles Wale Memorial in All Saints parish church, Little Shelford, Cambridgeshire:

"Sacred to the memory of General Sir Charles Wale KCB Colonel of HM 33rd Regiment of Foot Born 16 August 1765 Died 20 March 1845
Aged 81 Years He was the youngest son of Thomas Wale of this parish. He entered the army in 1779 and served at the siege and bombardment of Gibraltar by the French and Spaniards in 1801-1802-1803 and subsequently in Holland, Ireland & India. In February 1810 at the head of his brigade the Royal York Rangers he decided the capture of the island of Guadeloupe from the French by carrying in person the almost inaccessible heights of Matauba for which service in which he was severely wounded he received a medal and was made governor of Martinique till the peace 1814 when for his services during the war he was made Knight Commander of the Bath. True to the device and motto of his ancestors he displayed in bold relief the courage and energy of a Christian whose only shield and hope is salvation by the cross. Sr Charles Wale was thrice married. Firstly – to Louisa daughter of Revd Castel Sherard by whom he had issue five children Thomas Sherard who died unmarried at Surinam 1821 Charles and Philip Newton and Louisa who died in infancy and Alexader Malcolm Vicar of Sunninghil Berks (who in 1835 married Caroline Ardrighetti and had issue four daughters), The said Louisa died at Shelford 1806.  Secondly – in 1808 to Isabella daughter of Revd Geo. Johnson BD Prebendary of Lincoln and had issue Isabella Martha married in 1834 to Sherlock Willis Esq The above named Isabella Wale died at Barbados 1810, Thirdly – in 1815 to Henrietta daughter & coheiress of Revd Tho: Brent by whom he had issue six sons Cha. Brent born 1817 Rob. Gregory 1820 George Henry & Frederick twins born Geneva 1822 Arthur 1825 and Henry John 1827 and four daughters.

A family record 

The Wale Family may hold a record for the longevity over three generations, as described below in the journal Notes and Queries:

A LINK WITH THE PAST.—Mrs. Richard Dill of Hove celebrated her 100th birthday on 27 December 1923. She is the daughter of General Sir Charles Wale, K.C.B., who was born in 1762, and died in 1845, at the age of 83; her grandfather Mr. Thomas Wale was born in 1701 and died in 1796 at age of 95. These three lives therefore compass a period of-222 years. Has any family a record exceeding this ? That anyone living in 1923 should be able to say that her grandfather was born in the reign of William' III seems a sufficiently remarkable fact to appear in the records of  "N & Q". Further particulars of Mrs. Dill's family were published in The Sussex Daily News for 24 December. GERALD LODER.

References

Other sources 
. 
 

People from Little Shelford
1765 births
1845 deaths
British Army generals
Knights Commander of the Order of the Bath
British Army personnel of the American Revolutionary War
British Army personnel of the French Revolutionary Wars
British Army personnel of the Napoleonic Wars
88th Regiment of Foot (Connaught Rangers) officers
People educated at Wisbech Grammar School
British Governors of Martinique